Muhammad Rizky or known as Rizky Billar (born 12 July 1995) is an Indonesian actor and model. Billar is best known for him portrayal of Dendi in Anak Jalanan on RCTI and Iqbal in Jodoh Wasiat Bapak Babak 2 on ANTV.

Career 
Billar started his career in modeling, although initially he dreamed of becoming a soccer athlete and had attended training at KONI Medan. His dream ran aground because he was suffering from typhus symptoms.

Fate was more in favor of making him an artist, after he entered and won first place in the Aneka Yess! contest in 2011. This victory opened the opportunity to enter the world of entertainment.

Early life 
Born to a father named Daniel Eddy and Mrs. Rosmala Dewi, Billar, who is of Minangkabau descent, is the last of 6 children. Billar has Minang blood from his parents who come from Bukittinggi, West Sumatra.

Personal life 
Billar was officially engaged to the singer Lesti after the proposal ceremony, which was held on 13 June 2021 at Gedong Putih, Lembang, Bandung. The ceremony followed the Sundanese custom.

Billar officially married Lesti after holding the marriage contract and consent on 19 August 2022, which took place at the Intercontinental Hotel Pondok Indah, South Jakarta.

The couple had a son named Muhammad Leslar Al-Fatih Billar on 26 December 2021.

Domestic Violence Controversy
Billar was reported by Lesti to the South Jakarta Metro Police for domestic violence, which occurred on 28 September 2022 at around 01.51 Western Indonesia Time and 09.47 Western Indonesia Time. In her report, Lesti revealed that Billar responded violently after he was caught cheating. In the early hours of the morning, when Lesti asked to be sent back to her parents' house because of the incident, Billar got so emotional that he pushed Lesti down onto the bed and strangled Lesti. This happened repeatedly. Another incident occurred the next morning, when Billar tried to pull Lesti towards the bathroom. He also slammed his wife to the floor repeatedly so that her right hand, left, neck and body were injured. Due to Billar's actions, Lesti  submitted a report to the South Jakarta Metro Police in the evening around 22.00 Western Indonesia Time.

For his actions, he was officially dismissed as one of the presenters of the talent search show D'Academy which aired on Indosiar. This announcement was made by other presenters, namely Ramzi, Irfan Hakim, Gilang Dirga, Ruben Onsu, Jirayut and Tiyara Ramadhani in the broadcast live the program on 4 October 2022. This is in accordance with the Indonesian Broadcasting Commission appeal, which prohibits perpetrators of domestic violence from appearing on television or radio. Not only that, the award for the Gorgeous Dad category he won from the Infotainment Awards 2022 event which aired on SCTV and was given right on the day the incident occurred on 29 September 2022 was also revoked right a week later.

Billar was officially named a suspect by Polda Metro Jaya on 12 October 2022 and was detained the day after. On 15 October 2022, Billar was officially left from detention after 1 day in detention because Lesti withdrew the lawsuit.

Filmography

Films

Web series

Television

Television film 
 Seribu Kisah: Air Terjun Pemisah Jodoh (2015)
 Lovepedia: Love Game (2016)
 Cintaku Buat Mas Bro (2016)
 Rahasia Cinta Pelangi (2017)
 Cowok Ganteng Pejuang Dhuha (2017)
 Sate Ayam Bumbu Cinta (2018)
 Cinta Jangan Kasih Kendor (2018)
 I Love You To The Moon And Back (2018)
 Cinta Jangan Kasih Kendor (2018)
 Cintaku Pendek Tapi Kece (2018) as Kevin
 Ada Cinta Dibalik Gula (2018)
 Karena Netijen Ku Lari ke Desa (2018)
 Jodohku Berat Sama Dipikul, Ringan Sama Dijinjing (2018)
 Crazy Not Rich Mentog Di Warteg (2019)
 Berakit Ke Hulu Berenang Ke Hatimu (2019)
 Energi Cinta Cinderella Matre (2019)
 Resep Cinta Kaki Lima Rasa Bintang Lima (2019)

Music videos

Discography

Single

As the featured singer

References

External links 
 
 
 
 
 

1995 births
Living people
Indonesian models
Indonesian television personalities
Indonesian television presenters
Minangkabau people
People from Medan
People from North Sumatra